Interstate 84 (I-84) in the U.S. state of Idaho is a major Interstate Highway that traverses the state from the Oregon state line in the northwest to Utah state line in the southeast. It primarily follows the Snake River across a plain that includes the cities of Boise, Mountain Home, and Twin Falls. The highway is one of the busiest in Idaho and is designated as the Vietnam Veterans Memorial Highway.

I-84 runs for  within Idaho, beginning near Ontario, Oregon, and traveling concurrent with several U.S. routes through the Boise metropolitan area and Mountain Home towards Twin Falls. I-84 splits away from US 30 and the Snake River at a junction with I-86 near Declo, where it turns southeast to cross the Sublett Range into northern Utah. The highway has an auxiliary route, I-184, which serves downtown Boise.

Route description

It has a single auxiliary route, I-184 in Boise, and several business routes. The highway was officially designated as the Vietnam Veterans Memorial Highway in 2014, mirroring the name for Oregon's section of I-84. The Idaho section of I-84 is maintained by the Idaho Transportation Department (ITD), which conducts an annual survey of traffic on certain highway segments that is expressed in terms of average annual daily traffic (AADT), a measure of traffic volume for any average day of the year. Average daily traffic volumes on I-84 in 2018 ranged from a minimum of 9,552 vehicles near Sweetzer Summit and 139,113 vehicles at I-184 in western Boise.

Boise and Treasure Valley

I-84 enters the state of Idaho after crossing the Snake River from Ontario, Oregon, west of Fruitland, Idaho. The four-lane freeway travels southeast along the Snake River and passes an eastbound-only rest area and visitors center, which mirrors a westbound facility on the Oregon side of the river. Its first interchange is with US 95, the primary north–south highway in Idaho, at Palisades Corner south of Fruitland. I-84 continues southeast across farmland in the Snake River Plain and straddles the edge of a hill. South of New Plymouth the freeway intersects and becomes concurrent with US 30. The paired highways continue south along the side of a hill and cross into Canyon County northeast of Notus.

The freeway enters the Treasure Valley, which also constitutes much of the Boise metropolitan area, near the outskirts of Caldwell and intersects State Highway 44 (SH-44), which continues east to Middleton and Eagle. Shortly before crossing the Boise River into Downtown Caldwell, I-84 and US 30 begin a brief concurrency with US 20 and US 26, with both continue west towards Parma and the Oregon state border. The freeway skirts the north side of Downtown Caldwell, which is served by a designated business route, and passes through residential neighborhoods before US 20 and US 26 split off and travel east onto Franklin Road. I-84 and US 30 continue southeast through an industrial area and pass the Caldwell Industrial Airport and Karcher Mall before reaching the city of Nampa. The freeway travels through an industrial area on the northwestern side of Nampa, parallel to a set of railroad tracks, but turns east to bypass the city center. SH-55 joins the concurrency at an interchange with Karcher Road and I-84 Business returns to the freeway at an interchange located near Nampa Gateway Center, the Nampa campus of the College of Western Idaho, and the Ford Idaho Center.

I-84 expands from four lanes to eight lanes as it leaves Nampa and enters Ada County, passing through suburban neighborhoods in Meridian. The freeway crosses under two single-point urban interchanges at Ten Mile Road and SH-69, along with a partial cloverleaf interchange where SH-55 splits from the concurrency to head north. I-84 enters the city of Boise and expands to ten lanes before an interchange with I-184, an auxiliary route that travels into Downtown Boise. I-84 turns southeast and travels around the city's outer residential neighborhoods, passing the main terminal at Boise Airport and a nearby industrial area. The freeway is rejoined by US 20 and US 26 before leaving Boise, climbing out of Treasure Valley by following Fivemile Creek over a barren plateau.

Mountain Home and Magic Valley

The highway crosses into Elmore County and rejoins the Union Pacific Railroad's Nampa Subdivision as it passes the Morley Nelson Snake River Birds of Prey National Conservation Area. I-84 then travels around the city of Mountain Home, while a signed business route serves the city center and leads to the nearby Mountain Home Air Force Base. On the east side of the city, I-84 intersects SH-51 and ends its concurrency with US 20, which continues east towards Sun Valley, Idaho Falls, and Yellowstone National Park. I-84, US 26, and US 30 continue southeast through the conservation area and descends from the plateau into the Snake River Plain. The freeway travels around the north side of Hammett, which is served by a business route that connects to SH-78, and reaches the Snake River.

I-84 travels upstream along the north bank of the Snake River to Glenns Ferry, where it bypasses the town and Three Island Crossing State Park. The freeway crosses over the river twice east of Glenns Ferry to avoid a bend in the river, which is followed by the railroad. After entering Gooding County, I-84 reaches the town of Bliss, where US 30 and US 26 both split from the freeway and end their concurrency. US 30 travels south along the Snake River towards Hagerman, while US 26 runs east across the plains to Gooding and Craters of the Moon National Monument and Preserve. The freeway continues southeast and crosses  over the Mallad Gorge (part of Thousand Springs State Park) on a pair of level bridges. I-84 then passes through farmland on the edge of a lava plain while following an abandoned railroad right of way to Wendell, where it intersects SH-46.

The freeway travels around the south side of Wendell and turns east to follow an active railroad through a rural area that marks the boundary of Jerome County. I-84 reaches the county seat, also named Jerome, and turns southeast after intersecting SH-25 to bypass the city. The interstate intersects SH-79 on the south side of Jerome and reaches a partial cloverleaf interchange with US 93 across the Snake River Canyon from the city of Twin Falls. I-84 then proceeds eastward through the rural Magic Valley, staying on the north side of the Snake River. It intersects SH-50 at Tipperary Corner and bends south around Skeleton Butte and a municipal airport in Hazelton. Between Hazelton and the Minidoka County line, I-84 is concurrent with SH-25, which continues along the north side of the valley.

Southeastern Idaho

I-84 passes north of Burley, intersecting SH-27 near Paul. At a partial cloverleaf interchange in northeastern Heyburn, the freeway intersects SH-24 and is rejoined by US 30, beginning a new concurrency as the highway leaves the Magic Valley. I-84 crosses over the Snake River into Cassia County and intersects SH-25 and SH-25 at an interchange on the east bank of the river near Declo. Near the Minidoka National Wildlife Refuge, I-84 reaches the western terminus of I-86, which carries US 30 and follows the Snake River upstream to American Falls and Pocatello. I-84 turns southeast from the interchange and continues into the Raft River Valley, running parallel to SH-81 near Horse Butte in view of the Cotterel Mountains.

After crossing the rural valley, I-84 begins following Meadow Creek and climbs into Mortenson Canyon, which marks the northeastern extent of the Black Pine Mountains. I-84 continues southeast across the valley, passing a set of rest areas in Oneida County, and reaches the Utah state border northwest of Snowville. The freeway continues into Utah and passes through Ogden before terminating at a junction with I-80 in the Wasatch Range.

History

Prior to the construction of I-84, the corridor was served by Idaho State Highway 2 and Route A of the Sampson Trails system. U.S. Route 30 was created in 1926 under the national numbered highway system, traveling through southern Idaho along the historic Oregon Trail. Near Declo, US 30 split into two routes: U.S. Route 30N, following the Snake River to Pocatello, and U.S. Route 30S, providing a shorter connection to the Salt Lake City area.

The Interstate highway was initially designated in 1957 as Interstate 82, but was renumbered as Interstate 80N in 1958 to correspond with US 30.

The route of I-80N between Nampa and Boise was selected in 1958 as one of eight proposals and completed in stages between 1965 and 1968. Rural sections in southwestern Idaho had already been completed by the mid-1960s, connecting Ontario, Oregon, to Caldwell, and Boise to Mountain Home. The  Nampa–Meridian section opened to traffic on September 29, 1965. Another  from SH-69 in Meridian to western Boise opened on December 12, 1968, at a cost of $9.5 million. The freeway was extended west from Nampa to Caldwell on December 21, 1966, filling a gap in Interstate 80N and connecting to an already-completed rural section. The  bypass around southeastern Boise was opened on December 1, 1969. It cost $7.13 million to construct and included five interchanges. Another section was opened around the same time in Sublett in eastern Cassia County, which caused the killing of eighteen mule deer from a local herd from collisions with drivers within the first six weeks.

Renumbering and reconstruction

On May 1, 1980, I-80N was renumbered to I-84 to eliminate confusion with the western section of the non-suffixed I-80, which split from I-80N in Salt Lake City and continued west to San Francisco. The change was approved by AASHTO in July 1977 and resulted in the replacement of 1,000 signs along the freeway in Idaho.

Several rest areas on I-84 were closed in 1992 due to budget cuts and maintenance issues and their restoration was dependent on several federal highway bills that were never passed.

To address increasing traffic congestion in the Boise metropolitan area, fueled by population growth and suburban development, the Idaho Transportation Department (ITD) has widened  of I-84 with funds from a bond sale approved by the state legislature in 2005. A  section between eastern Nampa and Meridian was widened to six lanes in October 2009 and eight lanes in August 2011 as part of a $113 million expansion project. The agency has also built several single-point urban interchanges (SPUIs) in Meridian and Boise to improve efficiency.

Construction of a widened eight-lane section of I-84 through Nampa began in July 2019 and was completed two years later at a cost of $150 million. The project included several new overpasses and rebuilt interchanges—including one SPUI—from Franklin Boulevard to Karcher Road (SH-55). A second phase to expand the freeway to six lanes for  through Caldwell began construction in 2021 and is expected to be completed in 2023 at a cost of $300 million. Further work, extending northwest to the SH-44 interchange near Middleton, is under design and study .

In 2017, the ITD also began work to resurface and restore fifteen bridges on I-84 that had deteriorated over their lifespan.

In 2014 and 2019, because of increased speeds and the installation of new interchanges at Declo and Twin Falls, the ITD closed the Jerome rest area and extended the Cotterell rest area to make way for a new weigh station. To remedy this Idaho joined the Interstate Oasis Program and opened three truck stops in Twin Falls and Jerome.

Exit list

References

External links

Idaho Transportation Dept. – Milepost log – Interstate 84
Roadcams – Interstate 84
 David Rumsey Map Collection – Historic road map (1937) – Idaho, Montana, Wyoming – Texaco (Rand McNally)
Idaho highway map (1956) – Shell (H.M. Gousha)

84
 Idaho
Transportation in Payette County, Idaho
Transportation in Canyon County, Idaho
Transportation in Ada County, Idaho
Transportation in Elmore County, Idaho
Transportation in Gooding County, Idaho
Transportation in Jerome County, Idaho
Transportation in Minidoka County, Idaho
Transportation in Cassia County, Idaho
Transportation in Oneida County, Idaho